The 2018–19 season was C.D. Marathón's 68th season in existence and the club's 53rd consecutive season in the top fight of Honduran football. The club fought for its 10th league title, in which they failed on both Apertura and Clausura tournaments. 

Facing also the 2018 Honduran Cup and the 2019 Honduran Supercup, the club went on to win the last one, the first Supercup in their history.

Overview
Héctor Vargas renewed his contract on April 23, during the 2017–18 Clausura tournament.

Apertura

Transfers in

Transfers out

Standings

Matches

Results by round

Regular season

Playoffs

 Real España won 4–3 on aggregate.

Clausura

Transfers in

Transfers out

Standings

Matches

Results by round

Regular season

Semifinals

 Motagua won 4–2 on aggregate.

President Cup

Round of 64

Round of 32

Round of 16

Honduran Supercup

CONCACAF Champions League

Round of 16 

Santos Laguna won 11–2 on aggregate.

References

C.D. Marathón seasons
Honduran football clubs 2018–19 season